The 2020–21 season was the 105th season in existence of FC Groningen and the club's 21st consecutive season in the top flight of Dutch football. In addition to the domestic league, FC Groningen participated in this season's edition of the KNVB Cup. The season covered the period from 1 July 2020 to 30 June 2021.

Players

First-team squad

Out on loan

Transfers

In

Out

Pre-season and friendlies

Competitions

Overview

Eredivisie

League table

Results summary

Results by round

Matches
The league fixtures were announced on 24 July 2020.

European competition play-offs

KNVB Cup

Statistics

Goalscorers

References

External links

FC Groningen seasons
FC Groningen